"Out of the Question" is a popular song by Irish singer Gilbert O'Sullivan. It was written by O'Sullivan and produced by Gordon Mills. 

The song became a hit in the only two countries it had been released as a single: the U.S. (#17) and Canada (#9). It was a much bigger adult contemporary hit, reaching number two and number one in those nations, respectively.

Chart performance

Weekly charts

Year-end charts

References

External links
 

1972 songs
1973 singles
Gilbert O'Sullivan songs
Songs written by Gilbert O'Sullivan
MAM Records singles